"Find Us" (sometimes subtitled "In the Back of the Club") is a song by East Coast hip hop group the Beatnuts. It was released as the second single from the album Milk Me as a CD single and 12-inch with "Hot" as its U.S. B-side and "It's Nothing" as its UK B-side. The song was produced by the Beatnuts and features raps by Juju and Psycho Les, as well as a chorus sung by Akon. The song's lyrics are both braggadocios and sexually explicit. Its beat is characterized by a stomp-and-clap percussion, as well as an intermittent whistling noise. The song also features live instrumentation provided by guitarist Eric Krasno and keyboardist Neal Evans.

"Find Us" was released to mainly positive critical reception: Jason Birchmeier of AllMusic considered it a "standout" song, while Tom Doggett of RapReviews.com added that it has a "marvelous minimalist beat" and "catchy hook." Low Key of MVRemix.com described "Find Us" as "a perfect club song for the summer" because of its "infectious handclaps." On a less positive note, Robert DeGracia of AllHipHop.com claimed: "['Find Us'] is a complete eye-crosser that makes listeners struggle to make sense of what's exactly rocking around the clock."

Music video
"Find Us" failed to chart despite its critical reception and the release of a Ulysses Terrero-directed music video. The video was controversially not played on BET because some suspected the channel was anti-underground hip hop. BET justified their decision claiming, "BET doesn't break new artists," in reference to Akon. The music video shows the Beatnuts and Akon rapping in a club environment.

Track listings

UK CD single 
 "Find Us (Radio)" (3:14)
 "Find Us (Original)" (3:14)
 "Find Us (Instrumental)" (3:14)
 "It's Nothing (Radio)" (3:35)
 "It's Nothing (Original)" (3:35)

US 12" vinyl
A-side
 "Find Us (Radio Edit)"
 "Find Us (Original Version)"
 "Find Us (Instrumental Version)"
B-side
 "Hot (Radio Edit)"
 "Hot (Original Version)"
 "Hot (Instrumental Version)"

UK 12" vinyl
A-side
 "Find Us (In the Back of the Club) (Radio)"
 "Find Us (In the Back of the Club) (Original)"
 "Find Us (In the Back of the Club) (Instrumentaly)"
B-side
 "It's Nothing (Radio)"
 "It's Nothing (Original)"
 "It's Nothing (Instrumental)"

References

2004 songs
2004 singles
The Beatnuts songs
Akon songs
Songs written by Akon